List of the colonial governors and municipal presidents of the Municipality of Monterrey, in the state of Nuevo León. Monterrey Municipality includes the city of Monterrey.

See also
 Timeline of Monterrey, Mexico
Governor of Nuevo León

External links
 Official site  of the government of Monterrey (municipality)

 01
Government of Nuevo León
Politics of Nuevo León
1596 establishments in the Spanish Empire